32nd Air Base   is a Polish Air Force base, located in Łask, about 30 km south-west of Łódź.  It is one of the two  bases where Poland's F-16 fighters are stationed, the other being 31st Air Base.  9 of them were first moved there in October 2008.  The goal is to have 16 fighters, operated by the 10th Tactical Squadron.

A detachment of the  US Air Force has been permanently based at Łask since November, 2012.  Additional units rotate to the base periodically to conduct training exercises. The force is thought to be nuclear-capable and has joined nuclear exercises with NATO.

The base airfield was built in 1957. The current base unit, combining infrastructure and ground personnel, was formed in 2001.

In the past there were plans to use this airfield for civilian airliners, but with the expansion of nearby Łódź Władysław Reymont Airport these have been shelved.

References

External links
32 Baza Lotnictwa Taktycznego  Official site in Polish

Polish Air Force bases